Jaroslav Just (6 February 1883 – 5 August 1928) was a Czech tennis player. He competed for Bohemia at the 1912 Summer Olympics and for Czechoslovakia at the 1920 Summer Olympics. He was the president of the Czechoslovak Tennis Association between 1919 and 1928.

References

External links
 

1883 births
1928 deaths
Czechoslovak male tennis players
Olympic tennis players of Bohemia
Olympic tennis players of Czechoslovakia
Tennis players at the 1912 Summer Olympics
Tennis players at the 1920 Summer Olympics
Tennis players from Prague